Avellone is an Italian surname. Notable people with the surname include:

Chris Avellone, American video game designer and comic book writer
Giuseppe Avellone (born 1943), Italian Olympic swimmer
Joseph Avellone (born 1948), American medical doctor, businessman, and politician

Italian-language surnames